Timmendorfer Strand (Timmendorf Beach) is a municipality in the district of Ostholstein, in Schleswig-Holstein, Germany.

Notable People 
 Lilo Peters (1913-2001), German painter and sculptor, lived in Timmendorfer Strand.

References

External links

Seaside resorts in Germany
Ostholstein
Populated coastal places in Germany (Baltic Sea)